Cidade Nova is a middle-to-lower-class neighborhood in Rio de Janeiro, Brazil. It is located between the Centro and the North Zone. The Sambadrome Marquês de Sapucaí is situated within this neighborhood.

References

Neighbourhoods in Rio de Janeiro (city)